Lieutenant Colonel James Thomas Morisset (1780 – 17 August 1852), penal administrator, was commandant of the second convict settlement at Norfolk Island, from 29 June 1829 to 1834.

Military career 
Born in London in 1780, he was commissioned into the 80th Regiment of Foot in 1798, seeing service in Egypt and British India, and was badly wounded in 1811 in the Peninsular War, leaving his face badly disfigured. He was promoted Lieutenant in 1801. Transferring to the 48th Foot, in 1817 he arrived in New South Wales with his regiment. He was promoted Major in 1819.

In December 1818 he was appointed as commandant and magistrate at Newcastle. His public works were admired by Governor Macquarie.  His attention to prisoners, and attempt to adapt punishments to individual convicts was also praised by Commissioner Bigge. He was regarded as a stern disciplinarian, one historian claiming "the cat-o'-nine-tails and the triangle … were in daily and almost hourly service". In 1823 he was appointed commandant at Bathurst where he restored order after clashes with aborigines had led to martial law being declared in the district.  He returned to England on leave in February 1825 where, at the age of 43, he married Emily Louisa Vaux.

While in England Morisset reported on convict control in New South Wales and applied for the post of commandant of Norfolk Island which was about to be re-established as a penal settlement for the most hardened convicts. He was recommended for this position by Bathurst, the Secretary of State for War and the Colonies, and promoted lieutenant colonel, but Governor Ralph Darling appointed him instead as superintendent of police. The Governor was apparently reluctant to appoint Morisset to Norfolk Island because of the high salary he had been promised and because he insisted in taking his family. Morisset bitterly resented this (?) no proof of this statement, but in 1829 got his way and was appointed commandant of Norfolk Island.  At the time the convict population was about 200 but rose to over 550 by 1831, and 700 the next year.

During his tenure there the convicts made several attempts at mutiny, and he gained the reputation as a strict disciplinarian.  Governor Darling regretted that "nothing but Severity has been attempted, to effect [the convicts] reformation'.  Morisset recommended importing a treadmill, a common form (Producing food) of punishment at the time, but the British government objected on the grounds of expense.

Darling was sympathetic to Morisset, calling him "a very Zealous Officer" whose duties were of "a most arduous nature".  He observed that "the Conduct of the Prisoners has of late been outrageous in the extreme, having repeatedly avowed … to Murder every one employed at the Settlement, and it is only by the utmost vigilance that they have been prevented accomplishing their object."  The convicts, he noted "are Men of the most desperate Character".  Morisset requested to be moved, but the government replied that he "should be reminded that it was at his own solicitations that he was appointed".

The editor of a Sydney newspaper, E. S. Hall, wrote in 1832 that the convicts on Norfolk Island had been "made the prey of hunger and nakedness at the caprice of monsters in human form … and cut to pieces by the scourge … [and] have no redress or the least enquiry made into their suffering".

An abortive mutiny in January 1834, which led to nine deaths and many wounded, resulted in a trial of the ringleaders being held on Norfolk Island instead of in Sydney.

During his time at Norfolk Island Morisset was dogged by ill-health, perhaps a result of his old head wound, and in 1834, because of a violent nervous disorder was given a year's leave in Sydney, Foster Fyans being appointed to act in his place.  When this leave expired Morisset resigned his post.

Morisset retired to farming near Bathurst, where he was appointed police magistrate.  He lost heavily in a bank crash and was forced to sell his property to pay his debts.  Although in ill-health he continued as magistrate until his death on 17 August 1852, leaving his wife and ten children in poverty. Emily and the children were not in poverty due to her inheritance from her family and the Morisset family.

Three of Morisset's sons continued his tradition of military service by becoming officers in the paramilitary Australian native police force which operated against Aboriginal groups resisting European colonisation. One of these sons, Edric Norfolk Vaux Morisset was Commandant of this force in the early 1860s.

Notes

References
Australian Dictionary of Biography, Vol. 2.
Hazzard, Margaret, Punishment Short of Death: a history of the penal settlement at Norfolk Island, Melbourne, Hyland, 1984. (NO proof in this book to the outrageous statements)
Hughes, Robert, The Fatal Shore, London, Pan, 1988. ( (Well known now as the Fatal Slur due to the unsubstantiated claims in this book)

External links 

 Colonial Secretary's papers 1822-1877, State Library of Queensland- includes digitised letters written by Morisset to the Colonial Secretary of New South Wales

1780 births
1852 deaths
48th Regiment of Foot officers
British Army personnel of the French Revolutionary Wars
British Army personnel of the Napoleonic Wars
Norfolk Island penal colony administrators
19th-century Australian public servants
Settlers of Australia
South Staffordshire Regiment officers
Military personnel from London